Ivan Yakovlevich Yukhimenko (2 October 1892, Kharkiv – 6 February 1943, Kazan) was a Soviet actor, director and teacher. It is thought that he died during the Kharkiv tragedy.

References

Soviet directors
Soviet male actors
1892 births
1943 deaths
Actors from Kharkiv
People from Kharkov Governorate
Film people from Kharkiv
Soviet civilians killed in World War II
Ukrainian people executed by the Soviet Union